The 48th International Film Festival of India was held on 20 to 28 November 2017 in Goa. "Celebrating the Future of Cinema" was set as the festival's theme and registrations were opened in early October 2017.

Filmmaker Sujoy Ghosh, who was appointed head of the jury of the Indian panorama section, resigned from the position on 14 November after alleging that the Ministry of Information and Broadcasting, that co-organizes the festival, dropped two films S Durga and Nude from screening in the Indian Panorama section, despite being chosen by the jury and without consulting them. Two other members Apurva Asrani and Gyan Correa quit the jury the following day.

Winners
Golden Peacock (Best Film): BPM (Beats per Minute) by Robin Campillo
IFFI Best Director Award: Vivian Qu for "Angels Wear White"
IFFI Best Actor Award (Male): Nahuel Pérez Biscayart for BPM (Beats per Minute)
IFFI Best Actor Award (Female): Parvathy for Take Off
IFFI Best Debut Director Award: Kiro Russo for Dark Skull
Silver Peacock Special Jury Award: Mahesh Narayanan for Take Off

Special Awards
IFFI ICFT UNESCO Gandhi Medal: Film Kshitij A Horizon by Manouj Kadaamh.
Life Time Achievement Award - Atom Egoyan
IFFI Indian Film Personality of the Year Award: Amitabh Bachchan

Juries-mentor

Indian Panorama

Feature films 
 Suresh Heblikar, filmmaker and actor
 Rahul Rawail, film director
 Satarupa Sanyal, film director, producer, actress, poet and social activist
 Gopi Desai, film director and actress
 Nishikant Kamat, filmmaker
 Merlvin Mukhim, actor and film producer
 Nikkhil Advani, Film producer, director and screenwriter
 Hari Viswanath, film director, screenwriter and producer
 Sachin Chatte, film critic
 Ruchi Narain, film director and screenwriter

Non-feature films 
 Sudhir Mishra, film director and screenwriter; President
 Tuhinabha Majumdar, film director and film writer
 Shankhajeet De, filmmaker
 Mithunchandra Chaudhari, film director
 Shiny Jacob Benjamin, film producer, film director and writer
 Tinni Mitra, film editor
 K. G. Suresh, journalist and columnist

Official selections

Special screenings

Opening film
Beyond the Clouds

Closing film
Thinking of Him

BRICS 
Out of the 30 films that were screened at the second BRICS Film Festival in June 2017 in China, seven award-winning were chosen to be screened.

Bond Retrospective 
Nine James Bond films were chosen to be featured to celebrate "over 50 years of James Bond's legacy".
 Dr. No (1962)
 Goldfinger (1964)
 On Her Majesty's Secret Service (1969)
 The Spy Who Loved Me (1977)
 Octopussy (1983)
 Licence to Kill (1989)
 GoldenEye (1995)
 The World Is Not Enough (1999)
 Skyfall (2012)

Committees 
Three committees — Preview, Steering and Technical — were constituted by the Ministry of Information and Broadcasting prior to inviting films for the festival. The Preview Committee, headed by filmmaker Vivek Agnihotri was set up to shortlist films for the festival. Filmmakers Jahnu Barua and Nagesh Kukunoor were named conveners of the Steering and Technical Committees.

Steering Committee
A Steering Committee was set up composed of noted entertainment industry professionals:
 Jahnu Barua, convener
 Shoojit Sircar
 Shaji N. Karun
 Anand Gandhi
 Piyush Pandey
 Prasoon Joshi
 Siddharth Roy Kapur
 Vani Tripathi Tikoo
 Meren Imchen
 Ashwiny Iyer Tiwari
 Bharat Bala
 Director, National Film Development Corporation of India

Film Preview Committee
A 40-member Film Preview Committee was set up to "enhance the involvement of the Indian film industry". Its members included:
 Vivek Agnihotri, filmmaker; convener
 Nitesh Tiwari, filmmaker
 Aniruddha Roy Chowdhury, filmmaker
 Bhaskar Hazarika, filmmaker
 Gautami Tadimalla, actress
 Hrishitaa Bhatt, actress 
 Pallavi Joshi, actress
 Khalid Mohamed, film critic
 Saibal Chatterjee, film critic
 Bhawana Somaaya, film critic and writer

References

External links
 

2017 film festivals
2017 festivals in Asia
Film festivals in India
2017 in Indian cinema
48th